Pacific Grove may refer to:
 
 Pacific Grove, Bonifacio Vale, Manila City, a location in the Grand Theft Auto III video game
 Pacific Grove, California, a coastal city in Monterey County, California in the United States
 Pacific Grove High School, a public high school located in Pacific Grove, California
 Pacific Grove Municipal Golf Links, a public 18-hole golf course owned by the city of Pacific Grove, California